Nepal competed at the 2018 Asian Games in Jakarta and Palembang, Indonesia, from 18 August to 2 September 2018.

Medalists

The following Nepal competitors won medals at the Games.

Competitors 
The following is a list of the number of competitors representing Nepal that will participate at the Games:

Archery 

Recurve

Athletics 

Nepal put-up six athletes (4 men's and 2 women's) to participate in the athletics competition at the Games.

Badminton 

Nepal entered the Games with 8 badminton players (4 men's and 4 women's). The men's team made an history by advance to the quarter finals after beat Pakistan 3–1.

Men

Women

Mixed

Basketball 

Summary

3x3 basketball
Nepal national 3x3 team participated in the Games, the men's team placed in the pool C while the women's team in the pool B based on the FIBA 3x3 federation ranking.

Men's tournament

Roster
The following is the Nepal roster in the men's 3x3 basketball tournament of the 2018 Asian Games.
Nischal Maharjan (4)
Mabindra Bhandari (5)
Ajay Kushwaha (6)
Aashish Basnet (7)

Pool C

Women's tournament

Roster
The following is the Nepal roster in the women's 3x3 basketball tournament of the 2018 Asian Games.
Anusha Malla (4)
Alina Gurung (5)
Bhawana Lama (6)
Shreya Khadka (7)

Pool B

Boxing 

Men

Women

Cycling

Mountain biking

Fencing 

Individual

Team

Football 

Nepal competed in the group D at the men's football event.

Summary

Men's tournament 

Roster

Group D

Golf 

Men

Judo 

Men

Women

Mixed

Kabaddi 

Nepal men's team competed at the Games with 12 member squad. The team did not advance to the knockout stage after finished fifth in the group stage.

Summary

Men's tournament 

Team roster

Mahesh Bohara (Captain)
Durga Kumal
Bijay Chand
Lal Mohar Yadav
Ranjit
Nageshwor Tharu
Bhupendra Chand
Amit Kunwar
Sagar Chaudhary
Mahesh Mondal
Kumar Lama
Ashok Thapa Magar

Group B

Karate 

Nepal participated in the karate competition at the Games with eight athletes (4 men's and 4 women's).

Kurash 

Men

Women

Paragliding 

Men

Women

Pencak silat 

Tanding

Roller sports

Skateboarding

Sepak takraw 

Men

Shooting 

Men

Women

Mixed team

Sport climbing 

Speed

Combined

Squash

Nepal competed in squash competition with 4 athletes. The athletes ended their journey by finished in the first round.

Singles

Team

Swimming 

Nepal entered the Games with four swimmers (2 men's and 2 women's). All the swimmers did not advance to the final round.

Men

Women

Table tennis 

Individual

Team

Taekwondo

Nepal competed in taekwondo competition with 14 athletes (6 men's and 8 women's). In the individual poomsae event, the taekwondoan defeated in the first round, while the women's team advance to the quarter finals after received walkover from the Uzbekistan team. In the kyorugi event, the athletes also defeated in the early round.

Poomsae

Kyorugi

Tennis 

Men

Women

Mixed

Triathlon 

Individual

Mixed relay

Volleyball

Indoor volleyball

Men's tournament

Team roster
The following is the Nepal roster in the men's volleyball tournament of the 2018 Asian Games.

Head coach:  Björn Lesley

Pool D

13th–20th quarterfinal

13th–16th semifinal

15th place game

Weightlifting 

Nepal participated in weightlifting competition with 4 weightlifters (2 men's and 2 women's). Kamal Bahadur Adhikari made the national record to his name lifting 122 kg in snatch, 162 in clean and jerk and 284 in total.

Men

Women

Wrestling 

Nepal participated six times in the wrestling competition at the Games since 1998.

Men's freestyle

Wushu 

Taolu

Sanda

Key: * TV – Technical victory.

References 

Nations at the 2018 Asian Games
2018
Asian Games